Lycaena dospassosi, the maritime copper, is a butterfly of the family Lycaenidae. It is found in eastern Canada.

The wingspan is 25–31 mm. Adults are on wing from July to mid-August.

The larvae feed on Potentilla egedii.

Taxonomy
It is often treated as a subspecies of Lycaena dorcas.

References

Lycaena
Endemic fauna of Canada
Butterflies described in 1940